Sophagasenos also spelt Sophagasenus or Sophagasenas was a local ruler of Kabul and Kapisa valley (Paropamisade of the classical writings) during the last decade of 3rd century BCE. Sophagasenus finds reference only in "The Histories" of Polybius.

Names and identity
Sophagasenus is probably derived from the name Shubhagasena.

According to Wilhem Von Pochhammer, Antiochus III, 6th successor of Seleucus, was resisted not by Mauryas but by a local ruler named Subhagasena.

According to the Cambridge History of India, Indian history knows no ruler of corresponding name, and it has therefore been conjectured that Sophagasenus was some local ruler who had taken advantage of the decay of the Maurya empire to establish his own in the country west of Indus. Historian John Ma calls Sophagasenos a local dynast, otherwise unknown from any of Indian sources. 

Historian Dr Romila Thapar is strongly against the view that Subhagasena was a Maurya king.

Polybius on Sophagasenus
Polybius, the Greek historian, makes reference to Sophagasenus in context with Antiochus III’s expedition across the Caucasus Indicus (Hindu Kush) in around 206 BCE. Having crossed the Caucasus Mountains, Antiochus moved up to Kabul and met Sophagasenus the king with whom he renewed league and friendship he had made previously. and received more elephants until he had one hundred and fifty of them all together. He then returned home via Arachosia, Drangiana and Karmania. No other source except Polybius makes any reference to Sophagasenus.

See also
 Kamboja Kingdom
Apraca dynasty
Bajaur casket

Notes

References

Sources
 

Indian warriors
3rd-century BC Indian monarchs
History of Pakistan